The Suifenhe–Manzhouli Expressway, designated as G10 and commonly referred to as the Suiman Expressway is an expressway that connects the cities of Suifenhe, Heilongjiang, China, and Manzhouli, Inner Mongolia. When fully complete, it will be  in length. Currently, the expressway is complete in its entirety in Heilongjiang Province, from Suifenhe to just northwest of Qiqihar. The section in Inner Mongolia, from Arun Banner to Manzhouli, is in the planning stage and not yet built.

Both ends of the expressway terminate at border towns with Russia. Suifenhe is the location of a border crossing with Russian locality of Pogranichny in Primorsky Krai. Manzhouli is across the border from Zabaykalsk in Zabaykalsky Krai. The expressway parallels much of China National Highway 301, a highway that connects Suifenhe and Manzhouli, and the Chinese Eastern Railway between the two cities.

The entirety of the expressway is part of Asian Highway 6.

Detailed Itinerary

References

Proposed roads in China
10
Expressways in Inner Mongolia
Expressways in Heilongjiang